is a Japanese footballer currently playing as a defender for Nara Club.

Career statistics

Club
.

Notes

References

External links

1996 births
Living people
Association football people from Nara Prefecture
International Pacific University alumni
Japanese footballers
Association football defenders
J3 League players
Japan Football League players
FC Imabari players
Nara Club players